The following is a partial list of the "D" codes for Medical Subject Headings (MeSH), as defined by the United States National Library of Medicine (NLM).

This list continues the information at List of MeSH codes (D10). Codes following these are found at List of MeSH codes (D12.644). For other MeSH codes, see List of MeSH codes.

The source for this content is the set of 2006 MeSH Trees from the NLM.

– amino acids, peptides, and proteins

– amino acids

– alanine
  – beta-alanine
  – pantothenic acid
  – lysinoalanine
  – mimosine

– amino acid chloromethyl ketones
  – tosyllysine chloromethyl ketone
  – tosylphenylalanyl chloromethyl ketone

– amino acids, acidic
  – aspartic acid
  – d-aspartic acid
  – isoaspartic acid
  – n-methylaspartate
  – potassium magnesium aspartate
  – glutamic acid
  – 1-carboxyglutamic acid
  – glutamates
  – polyglutamic acid
  – sodium glutamate
  – pyrrolidonecarboxylic acid

– amino acids, basic
  – arginine
  – argininosuccinic acid
  – benzoylarginine-2-naphthylamide
  – benzoylarginine nitroanilide
  – homoarginine
  – ng-nitroarginine methyl ester
  – nitroarginine
  – omega-n-methylarginine
  – tosylarginine methyl ester
  – asparagine
  – glutamine
  – proglumide
  – lysine
  – hydroxylysine
  – lysinoalanine
  – polylysine
  – ornithine
  – eflornithine

– amino acids, branched-chain
  – aminoisobutyric acids
  – isoleucine
  – leucine
  – valine
  – 2-amino-5-phosphonovalerate

– amino acids, cyclic
  – amino acids, aromatic
  – dextrothyroxine
  – phenylalanine
  – dihydroxyphenylalanine
  – cysteinyldopa
  – levodopa
  – methyldopa
  – fenclonine
  – p-fluorophenylalanine
  – melphalan
  – thyroxine
  – thyronines
  – diiodothyronines
  – triiodothyronine
  – triiodothyronine, reverse
  – tryptophan
  – 5-hydroxytryptophan
  – tyrosine
  – betalains
  – betacyanins
  – dihydroxyphenylalanine
  – cysteinyldopa
  – levodopa
  – methyldopa
  – diiodotyrosine
  – melanins
  – monoiodotyrosine
  – methyltyrosines
  – alpha-methyltyrosine
  – phosphotyrosine
  – cycloleucine
  – desmosine
  – histidine
  – ergothioneine
  – methylhistidines
  – imino acids
  – azetidinecarboxylic acid
  – proline
  – captopril
  – fosinopril
  – hydroxyproline
  – pyrrolidonecarboxylic acid
  – technetium tc 99m diethyl-iminodiacetic acid
  – technetium tc 99m disofenin
  – technetium tc 99m lidofenin
  – isodesmosine

– amino acids, diamino
  – arginine
  – argininosuccinic acid
  – benzoylarginine-2-naphthylamide
  – benzoylarginine nitroanilide
  – homoarginine
  – ng-nitroarginine methyl ester
  – nitroarginine
  – omega-n-methylarginine
  – tosylarginine methyl ester
  – asparagine
  – citrulline
  – cystathionine
  – cystine
  – diaminopimelic acid
  – glutamine
  – proglumide
  – homocystine
  – lysine
  – hydroxylysine
  – lysinoalanine
  – polylysine
  – ornithine
  – eflornithine

– amino acids, dicarboxylic
  – 2-aminoadipic acid
  – aspartic acid
  – d-aspartic acid
  – isoaspartic acid
  – n-methylaspartate
  – potassium magnesium aspartate
  – carbocysteine
  – cystathionine
  – cystine
  – glutamic acid
  – 1-carboxyglutamic acid
  – glutamates
  – polyglutamic acid
  – sodium glutamate
  – homocystine

– amino acids, essential
  – arginine
  – omega-n-methylarginine
  – histidine
  – isoleucine
  – leucine
  – lysine
  – methionine
  – phenylalanine
  – threonine
  – tryptophan
  – valine

– amino acids, neutral
  – asparagine
  – cysteine
  – glutamine
  – methionine
  – serine
  – threonine

– amino acids, sulfur
  – cystathionine
  – cysteic acid
  – cysteine
  – acetylcysteine
  – carbocysteine
  – cysteinyldopa
  – cystine
  – selenocysteine
  – ethionine
  – homocysteine
  – s-adenosylhomocysteine
  – homocystine
  – methionine
  – s-adenosylmethionine
  – n-formylmethionine
  – n-formylmethionine leucyl-phenylalanine
  – methionine sulfoximine
  – buthionine sulfoximine
  – selenomethionine
  – vitamin u
  – penicillamine
  – s-nitroso-n-acetylpenicillamine
  – thiopronine
  – thiorphan

– aminobutyric acids
  – aminoisobutyric acids
  – gamma-aminobutyric acid
  – vigabatrin

– aminocaproic acids
  – 6-aminocaproic acid
  – norleucine
  – diazooxonorleucine

– aminolevulinic acid

– canavanine

– creatine
  – phosphocreatine

– excitatory amino acids
  – aspartic acid
  – glutamic acid

– glycine
  – allylglycine
  – n-substituted glycines
  – glycocholic acid
  – glycodeoxycholic acid
  – glycochenodeoxycholic acid
  – sarcosine
  – thiopronine
  – thiorphan

– homoserine

– kynurenine

– oxamic acid

– phosphoamino acids
  – 2-amino-5-phosphonovalerate
  – phosphocreatine
  – phosphoserine
  – phosphothreonine
  – phosphotyrosine

– quisqualic acid

– rna, transfer, amino acyl

– serine
  – azaserine
  – cycloserine
  – droxidopa
  – enterobactin
  – phosphoserine

– threonine
  – phosphothreonine

The list continues at List of MeSH codes (D12.644).

D12.125